The New Zealand Electricity Commission was a government authority set up in 2003 to regulate the electricity sector in New Zealand. It was succeeded by the Electricity Authority in November 2010.

The Commission was established under the Electricity Act to regulate the operation of the electricity industry and markets (both wholesale and retail) in accordance with government energy policy. The Commission was established following extremely dry hydro years in 2001 and 2003, which led to government concerns that the electricity market did not provide adequate security of electricity supply.

The first Electricity Commissioner was Roy Hemmingway, who was succeeded by David Caygill in 2007.

See also
 Electricity Authority (New Zealand)

External links
 Electricity Commission website of 11 August 2010 archived at Internet Archive

New Zealand Crown agents
Electric power in New Zealand
2003 establishments in New Zealand
2010 disestablishments in New Zealand